Wang Ming (May 23, 1904 – March 27, 1974) was a senior leader of the early Chinese Communist Party (CCP) and the mastermind of the famous 28 Bolsheviks group. Wang was also a major political rival of Mao Zedong during the 1930s, opposing what he saw as Mao's nationalist deviation from the Comintern and orthodox Marxist–Leninist lines. According to Mao on the other hand, Wang epitomized the intellectualism and foreign dogmatism Mao criticized in his essays "On Practice" and "On Contradiction". The competition between Wang and Mao was a reflection of the power struggle between the Soviet Union, through the vehicle of the Comintern, and the CCP to control both the direction and future of the Chinese revolution.

Early life
On May 23, 1904, Wang Ming was born in Jinzhai, Anhui, as Chen Shaoyu to a poor peasant family. In 1920, he entered the Zhicheng Elementary School in Gushi County. Wang then entered the Third Agricultural School of the Anhui Province, which was founded by the revolutionary Zhu Yunshan. Zhu had a strong influence on the school's students, introducing many progressive journals and books such as New Youth and Communism ABC. In the school, Wang would encounter another strong influential figure in his life, A Ying (Qian Xinchun), his teacher. A Ying would teach Wang about Vladimir Lenin and Chen Duxiu.

During his school years, Wang was also active in the political movement. He led boycotts of Japanese products and corrupt elections. After his graduation in 1924, Wang enrolled in the Wuchang Business School, where he studied for a year. There he published several articles on revolution and communism. That same year he joined the May 30 Movement, which involved strikes and protests against imperialism during the Northern Expedition in Wuchang. In the summer of 1924, Wang joined the CCP.

From Moscow to Shanghai
In November 1925, the CCP sent Wang to Moscow Sun Yat-sen University in Russia. During this time, Wang mastered both the Russian language and Marxist–Leninist theory, becoming known by the Russian name Ivan Andreevich Golubev or simply Golubev. It was also during this time that Wang encountered his first major political adversary, Ren Zhuoxuan. Ren was appointed as the secretary of the university's student CCP branch. Eventually Wang's eloquence won over Ren's authoritarian style in various debates. Consequently, in April 1926, Wang was elected as chairman of the university's CCP branch. After the election, Pavel Mif, the university's vice president, became fond of Wang. In January 1927, when Mif came to China as the head of a Soviet delegation, Wang was his interpreter.

After the CCP's split with the Kuomintang (KMT) in 1927, Wang and Mif attended the CCP's 5th National Congress in Wuhan, after which Wang became Secretary for the CCP's Propaganda Department for two months. Wang was also a part-time editor of the Guidance journal where he published a few articles. After the July 15 coup in Wuhan, Wang returned to Moscow with Mif.

After the purge of Karl Radek by Joseph Stalin, Mif was appointed as president of Moscow Sun Yat-sen University, and then Vice Minister of the Eastern Department of Comintern. For his service and loyalty, Wang became Mif's protégé. Along with other activists such as Zhang Wentian, Bo Gu and Wang Jiaxiang, Wang Ming founded the 28 Bolsheviks group. They labeled themselves as orthodox communists. During his time in Moscow, Wang was involved in suppressing an organization of Chinese Trotskyists that had sprung up in the university.

In 1929, Wang, along with the rest of the 28 Bolsheviks, was sent back to China with the goal of taking over the leadership of the CCP. However, they met strong resistance within the CCP from members such as Zhang Guotao and Zhou Enlai. Not surprisingly, they were assigned insignificant positions. Meanwhile, Wang found comfort in dating a member of the 28 Bolsheviks, Meng Qingshu, who later became his wife. Wang was then transferred to the Propaganda Department of CCP, where Li Lisan was the incumbent minister. During a half year from 1929 to 1930, Wang published many articles in the party newspaper Red Flag and magazine Bolshevik, which supported the leftism embraced by Li. In 1930, when Wang attended a secret meeting in Shanghai, he was promptly arrested. But Wang was lucky enough to be ignored by the KMT secret police, who had no idea what value this young man might be to them. Wang was soon released after bribing the guard.

Wang was transferred to CCP's Central Labor Union after his release. Although Wang was a leftist and abided by Communist dogma strictly in essence, his beliefs were different from those of Li. Wang was more strict about adhering to the policies of the Comintern. He quickly found a temporary alliance with old CCP members, labor activists such as He Mengxiong, Lin Yunan (a relative of Lin Biao) against Li. In a meeting, Wang argued with Li and offended Li. As a price for his being impulsive and immature, Wang was discharged from his position and demoted to the Jiangsu division of CCP.

In August 1930, Zhou Enlai and Qu Qiubai were sent back to China by the Comintern to correct the leftism of Li, and Li was called to Moscow for repentance and lost his power. In December of the same year, Mif came to China as an envoy of the Comintern. With his mentor's strong support, Wang and his 28 Bolshevik associates entered the power center of the CCP in the 4th Plenary Meeting of 6th National Congress of CCP, by way of labeling both Li and old CCP members such as He and Luo Zhanglong as dissidents.

Of all the so-called 28 Bolsheviks, only Wang was an elected member of the CCP politburo. He was not a Commissioner of the Central Committee of CCP yet, this being a prerequisite for being a politburo member under the system proposed by Wang himself. With Mif staying in China for almost a year, the CCP was under his control, and Wang played an important role as his consultant. Although Xiang Zhongfa was the incumbent General Secretary, he was manipulated by Mif and Wang. While He and Luo were still acting to set up another group to divorce from this center, they suffered a deadly loss.
On January 17, 1931, in Shanghai, 36 communists, including He and five leaders of the League of Left-Wing Writers, were arrested. "Not until many years later did it emerge that [the Shanghai Police's] Special Branch had probably been tipped off by Wang," writes author Ben Macintyre. Wang "regarded the League as a cover for 'dissenting comrades' and wanted them liquidated," Macintyre writes. The next month, 23 of the arrested Communists were executed.

Before long, with the arrest of Gu Shunzhang, who was in charge of security for the CCP, many senior leaders such as Xiang and Yun Daiying were arrested and executed. Wang returned to Moscow with his wife with a medical excuse. After Wang's departure, under the direction of Zhou Enlai, an acting politburo was set up in Shanghai. Zhou, Zhang Wentian, Bo Gu, Kang Sheng, Chen Yun, and Lu Futan, Li Zhusheng were selected to be in charge of the daily work of the CCP. Among these people, Zhang, Bo Gu and Li were members of the 28 Bolsheviks and close associates of Wang, so Wang could still keep remote control over the CCP through his associates. Furthermore, Kang and Chen met him and became his supporters in Moscow several years later. Both Lu and Li would later defect to the KMT.

From Moscow to Yan'an

From November 1931 to November 1937, Wang worked and lived in Moscow as director of the CCP's delegation to the Comintern. During that period, he was elected as Executive Commissioner, member of the Presidium, and Alternate General of the Comintern. This indicated his prominence and popularity in the Comintern.

It was also during this time, under the direction of Bo Gu, that the CCP suffered greatly at the hands of the KMT, both in the cities and the countryside. This led to a general retreat of the CCP to the distant countryside, called the Long March. In the Zunyi Conference, the 28 Bolsheviks dissolved. Key members of the group — Zhang Wentian, Wang Jiaxiang, and Yang Shangkun — defected to Mao Zedong's camp. Moreover, Mao had replaced Bo Gu as head of the military, which was unknown to Wang and Comintern. As Mao consolidated his power, he became the actual paramount leader of CCP, even though Zhang Wentian was officially appointed as general secretary of the CCP in Zunyi Conference.

In 1931, after a false flag attack, Imperial Japan invaded the three provinces of northeast China. Wang made his contribution to China by lecturing on the united front against imperialism in the 7th Congress of Comintern in 1935. In August 1935, the CCP delegation to the Comintern issued the August 1 Manifesto, which called upon the Chinese to unite against Japan. In the same month, a CCP delegation to the Comintern held meetings to discuss the united front against imperialism. In the meeting, Wang pointed out that the archenemy of China was Japan, not Chiang Kai-shek, and that it was possible for Chinese revolutionaries to set up an alliance with Chiang.

After that, the delegation sent Zhang Hao, whose real name was Lin Yuying, also a relative of Lin Biao and a senior worker activist of CCP, back to Yan'an to announce the decision of this meeting. In the CCP politburo meeting (Wayaobu Meeting) in December, CCP made a decision to set up a united front against Japanese aggression, but still held out by labeling Chiang as the archenemy of the revolution, as much as Japan. In 1936 the Secretariat of the Comintern issued a telegram to the Secretariat of CCP to point out the error of listing Chiang with Japan as the archenemies of Chinese revolution, and that it was necessary to include Chiang's army in the war against Japan.

With the occurrence of the Xi'an Incident in 1936, the Marco Polo Bridge Incident and the Shanghai Hongqiao Airport Incident in 1937, a general war between China and Japan was unavoidable. Wang's blueprint for a united front against Japan was under construction, with the Red Army of the CCP transferred into the Eighth Route Army and the New Fourth Army fighting against Japan.

For the further direction of United Front, Wang was sent back to Yan'an with Kang Sheng and Chen Yun after being absent from China for 6 years. After the return of Wang, Mao expressed his respect for Wang as an envoy of the Comintern and for his great influence for putting forward the concept of United Front against Japan. Possibly Mao wanted to appeal to the Comintern and Soviet Union behind Wang, from whom Mao desperately needed support both in money and weaponry. So when Wang brought forward a new list of leaders of CCP, Mao showed his humility by putting Wang in the first place. Wang demoted his former ally Zhang Wentian from the number 1 place to the number 7 place, which weakened his own camp and created new opponents by driving Zhang to Mao's group.

Wang, Kang and Chen were elected into the new politburo, with Wang as secretariat for the Secretariat of the Central Committee of the CCP which was in charge of the daily operation of CCP headquarters. Chen was in charge of organization and Kang in charge of security, but oddly enough, Chen and Kang turned to Mao's camp, and as a result, Wang lost two important potential supporters. Moreover, when Wang passed by Xinjiang during his trip to China, he ordered Deng Fa, the notorious security boss for CCP, to arrest senior leaders of CCP Yu Xiusong, Huang Cao, Li Te and two others, who were his former opponents now working for the warlord Sheng Shicai under the direction of CCP. Five of them were tortured and executed in the prison of Sheng, accused of being Trotskyists. When Wang boasted about his dirty work to Zhang Guotao, Zhang, who was regarded as dissident himself, was greatly irritated, for he had known these old CCP members quite well and worried about being persecuted himself. After this incident, Zhang despised Wang and would never support him.

When Wang returned to Yan'an, he was admired by most of the CCP members as a talent of Marxism for his erudition and deep insights into Marxism and Leninism. Some senior CCP leaders, including Zhou Enlai and Peng Dehuai, showed their respect for Wang, which reportedly made Mao jealous and irritated.

Furthermore, Wang began to disagree with Mao over major issues on the United Front. Wang believed all CCP work should be carried out within the framework of the United Front; Mao insisted CCP should maintain its independence from the United Front instead. In order to enforce his policy, Wang made the mistake of leaving the position of Secretariat of the CCP in charge of the daily operations of the CCP headquarters, and went for the position of General Secretary of the Yangtze Division of CCP to handle United Front issues with the KMT in Wuhan, which meant Wang had left the power base in Yan'an, with Mao now able to use all means to strengthen his power grip without any interference.

Decline

In its battle against Imperial Japan, the KMT suffered great losses due to internal corruption, incompetence in military command, outdated military supplies and logistics, and the general strength of the Japanese military. As a strong advocate of the United Front, Wang was damaged as well by the KMT's failure in the battlefield as the KMT forces bore the brunt of the fighting; under Mao's urging the Communists rarely engaged the Japanese army in significant battles. After the KMT lost the battles of Xuzhou and Wuhan, in 1938, Wang suffered a heavy blow as the Yangtze Division was abolished and he himself was dismissed back to Yan'an. Yan'an was divided into the Southern China and Central Plain Divisions, led by Zhou Enlai and Liu Shaoqi respectively; this was part of Mao's plot to break up the alliance of Wang and Zhou, and to promote his associate Liu. Wang was called back to Yan'an to await his fate.

Wang was reassigned to several insignificant ceremonial jobs. Moreover, Mao deprived Wang of authority by use of propaganda, preventing Wang from publishing his opinions and articles. With the dissolution of the Comintern in 1943, Wang lost all hope for saving his political life. In 1942 Mao launched the Yan'an Rectification Movement against dogmatism and empiricism. Wang became Mao's main target as representative of dogmatism and Zhou as representative of empiricism. Although Wang experienced great humiliation, he was still fortunate to escape from tortures similar to those inflicted by Kang Sheng's secret police on other CCP members. Nonetheless, in his later book 50 Years of the CPC, and in Yan'an Diary, written by a reporter from the Soviet Union, Wang accused Mao of plotting to murder him by poison. Although there are still disagreements over this accusation, Wang's health was certainly greatly damaged under this stress.

In the later stages of the Rectification Campaign, Wang was forced to make a confession and apology in a public meeting. It was only after Mao received a telegram from Georgi Dimitrov that he stopped the persecution. As a show of leniency and a sign of appeasement to Dimitrov (and the Soviet Union standing behind him), Mao placed Wang on the CCP's Central Committee in the 7th National Congress (It is noteworthy that back in 1931, Dimitrov and his wife Roza Yulievna Fleishmann had adopted Fani, Wang's daughter. Eventually, as Wang's credibility and influence waned, Moscow's leaders began to acknowledge Mao's leadership.

During the period of the Chinese Civil War, Wang was appointed as director of policy research of the CCP and responsible for some insignificant legislative work.

From Beijing to Moscow

It was only after the establishment of the People's Republic of China in 1949, that Wang reappeared from the shadows on to the political stage. He was elected as director of the Central Legal Committee of the CCP and the Central People's Government. Before he was elected as commissioner of the Central Committee of CCP in the 8th National Congress of CCP in 1956, Wang went to Moscow for medical treatment and would never return.

Wang wrote many articles denouncing the CCP during the conflict between the CCP and the Communist Party of the Soviet Union in the 1960s and 1970s. His memoirs did provide some useful information about CCP history. Above all, Wang was lucky to escape the persecution of the Cultural Revolution, and lived in peace until his death in 1974 in Moscow.

References

Sources
 Gao Hua, How Did The Red Sun Rise: The Cause And Effect Of Zheng Feng In Yanan, The Chinese University Press, 2000
 Wang Ming, 50 Years of the CCP, Orient Press, 2004

External links

The Revolutionary Movement in the Colonial Countries - Speech at Seventh Comintern Congress, 1935

1904 births
1974 deaths
Chinese Communist Party politicians from Anhui
People from Jinzhai County
Chinese emigrants to the Soviet Union
People's Republic of China politicians from Anhui
Republic of China politicians from Anhui
Moscow Sun Yat-sen University alumni
Members of the Politburo Standing Committee of the Chinese Communist Party
People granted political asylum in the Soviet Union
General Secretaries and Chairmen of the Chinese Communist Party
Politicians from Anqing
Burials at Novodevichy Cemetery
National Wuhan University alumni